Lyon County (standard abbreviation: LY) is a county located in the U.S. state of Kansas. As of the 2020 census, the county population was 32,179. The county seat and largest city is Emporia.  The county was named for General Nathaniel Lyon, who was killed at the Battle of Wilson's Creek in the Civil War.

History

Early history

For many millennia, the Great Plains of North America was inhabited by nomadic Native Americans. From the 16th century to 18th century, the Kingdom of France claimed ownership of large parts of North America. In 1762, after the French and Indian War, France secretly ceded New France to Spain, per the Treaty of Fontainebleau.

19th century
In 1802, Spain returned most of the land to France, but keeping title to about 7,500 square miles. In 1803, most of the land for modern day Kansas was acquired by the United States from France as part of the 828,000 square mile Louisiana Purchase for 2.83 cents per acre.

In 1806, Zebulon Pike led the Pike Expedition westward from St Louis, Missouri, of which part of their journey followed the Cottonwood River through Lyon County.

In 1854, the Kansas Territory was organized, then in 1861 Kansas became the 34th U.S. state. In 1862, Lyon County was established from the county formerly known as Breckinridge County.

In 1871, the Atchison, Topeka and Santa Fe Railway extended a main line from Emporia to Newton.

Geography

Adjacent counties
 Wabaunsee County (north)
 Osage County (northeast)
 Coffey County (southeast)
 Greenwood County (south)
 Chase County(west)
 Morris County (northwest)

National protected area
 Flint Hills National Wildlife Refuge (part)

Demographics

Lyon County comprises the Emporia, KS Micropolitan Statistical Area.

As of the census of 2000, there were 35,935 people, 13,691 households, and 8,639 families residing in the county. There were 14,757 housing units at an average density of 17 per square mile (7/km2). The racial makeup of the county was 83.27% White, 2.27% Black or African American, 0.47% Native American, 2.04% Asian, 0.01% Pacific Islander, 9.79% from other races, and 2.16% from two or more races. 16.72% of the population were Hispanic or Latino of any race.

There were 13,691 households, out of which 32.60% had children under the age of 18 living with them, 50.80% were married couples living together, 8.40% had a female householder with no husband present, and 36.90% were non-families. 28.50% of all households were made up of individuals, and 9.80% had someone living alone who was 65 years of age or older. The average household size was 2.51 and the average family size was 3.12.

In the county, the population was spread out, with 25.70% under the age of 18, 16.20% from 18 to 24, 27.20% from 25 to 44, 19.10% from 45 to 64, and 11.60% who were 65 years of age or older. The median age was 31 years. For every 100 females, there were 97.40 males. For every 100 females age 18 and over, there were 95.20 males.

The median income for a household in the county was $32,819, and the median income for a family was $43,112. Males had a median income of $28,865 versus $21,338 for females. The per capita income for the county was $15,724. About 9.60% of families and 14.50% of the population were below the poverty line, including 15.60% of those under age 18 and 9.20% of those age 65 or over.

Government

Presidential elections
Lyon County has been strongly Republican for most of its history. In only seven presidential elections from 1880 to the present has the county failed to back the Republican candidate, the most recent being Lyndon B. Johnson in his national landslide of 1964. The Republican party did come close to losing the county in 1992 and 2008, however.

Laws
Lyon County was a prohibition, or "dry", county until the Kansas Constitution was amended in 1986 and voters approved the sale of alcoholic liquor by the individual drink with a 30 percent food sales requirement. The food sales requirement was removed with voter approval in 1992.

The county voted "No" on the 2022 Kansas Value Them Both Amendment, an anti-abortion ballot measure, by 63% to 37% despite backing Donald Trump with 54% of the vote to Joe Biden's 43% in the 2020 presidential election.

Education

Colleges and universities
 Emporia State University in Emporia
 Flint Hills Technical College in Emporia

Unified school districts
 North Lyon County USD 251
 Southern Lyon County USD 252
 Emporia USD 253

School district office in neighboring county
 Chase County USD 284

Communities

Cities

 Admire
 Allen
 Americus
 Bushong
 Emporia (county seat) 
 Hartford
 Neosho Rapids
 Olpe
 Reading

Unincorporated communities
 Miller
 Plymouth

Townships
Lyon County is divided into eleven townships. The city of Emporia is considered governmentally independent and is excluded from the census figures for the townships. In the following table, the population center is the largest city (or cities) included in that township's population total, if it is of a significant size.

Notable people

R. Lee Ermey was born in Emporia on March 24, 1944, and died on April 15, 2018. He was a retired United States Marine Corps Gunnery Sergeant, Drill Instructor and actor. Ermey was often best known for his roles of authority figures, such as his breakout performance as Gunnery Sergeant Hartman in Full Metal Jacket, Mayor Tilman in the Alan Parker film Mississippi Burning, Bill Bowerman in Prefontaine, Sheriff Hoyt in The Texas Chainsaw Massacre remake, and plastic army men leader Sarge in the Toy Story films.

Homer Woodson Hargiss was an innovative college football coach who regularly used the forward pass and records show that it was used as early as 1910, three years before Knute Rockne began to call the play. He was head coach at both the College of Emporia and Emporia State.  He is also credited with inventing the huddle.

Jerry Kill was the head football coach for the Minnesota Golden Gophers. He has over 100 wins in his career as a head coach, having worked as a head coach through several institutions at the college level.

Dean Smith is a retired American head coach of men's college basketball. Originally from Emporia, Kansas, Smith has been called a “coaching legend” by the Basketball Hall of Fame. Smith is best known for his successful 36-year coaching tenure at the University of North Carolina at Chapel Hill. Smith coached from 1961 to 1997 and retired as the NCAA Division I men's basketball record-holder for victories (879), a record which was surpassed by Bob Knight in 2007, Mike Krzyzewski in 2011, and Jim Boeheim in 2012. During his tenure as head coach of North Carolina, the team won two national titles and appeared in 11 Final Fours.

William Allen White was a renowned American newspaper editor, politician, author, and leader of the Progressive movement. Between 1896 and his death White became the iconic spokesman for middle America. He won a 1923 Pulitzer Prize for his editorial "To an Anxious Friend," published July 27, 1922, after being arrested in a dispute over free speech following objections to the way the state of Kansas handled the men who participated in the Great Railroad Strike of 1922.

Maud Wagner was the first known female tattoo artist in the United States. She was a circus performer and traveled with her husband as both tattoo artists and as "tattooed attractions."

See also
 National Register of Historic Places listings in Lyon County, Kansas

 Jacobs Creek Flood

References

Notes

Further reading

 Standard Atlas of Lyon County, Kansas; Geo. A. Ogle & Co; 84 pages; 1918.
 Standard Atlas of Lyon County, Kansas; Geo. A. Ogle & Co; 60 pages; 1901.
 An Illustrated Historical Atlas of Lyon County, Kansas; Edwards Brothers; 58 pages; 1878.

External links

County
 
 Lyon County - Directory of Public Officials
Historical
 Lyon County - History, Kansas State Historical Society
Maps
 Lyon County Maps: Current, Historic, KDOT
 Kansas Highway Maps: Current, Historic, KDOT
 Kansas Railroad Maps: Current, 1996, 1915, KDOT and Kansas Historical Society

 
Kansas counties
1862 establishments in Kansas
Emporia, Kansas micropolitan area
Populated places established in 1862